Oxycera terminata, the yellow-tipped soldier, is a European species of soldier fly.

References

Stratiomyidae
Diptera of Europe
Taxa named by Christian Rudolph Wilhelm Wiedemann
Insects described in 1822